Xiaoguang is a 2000 Taiwanese television film directed and produced by Doze Niu, starring himself as Ma Xiaoguang, a formerly successful child actor who struggles to break into the acting world as an adult. The screenplay is by Wang Shao-di, who directed the 1996 film Accidental Legend in which Doze Niu starred in.

Cast
Doze Niu as Ma Xiaoguang
Zhang Xiaowen as Ma Xiaoguang (child)
Tarcy Su as Li Yan, a celebrity singer-actress
Lee Ching-mei as Xiuxia, Ma Xiaoguang's mother
Chin Shih-chieh as Ma Xiaoguang's father
Chu Zhong-heng as Ma Xiaoguang's best friend
Li Hsing as Director Li
Lang Tsu-yun as Weng Mingzhu, a talent agent
Chung Chia-chen as Ma Xiaoguang's aunt

Awards and nominations

References

2000 films
Films directed by Doze Niu
2000s Mandarin-language films
Taiwanese television films
China Television original programming
Films shot in Taiwan
Films set in Taiwan
2000 directorial debut films